Crumlin Rugby Football Club is a rugby union team from the village of Crumlin near Caerphilly in Wales. The club is a member of the Welsh Rugby Union and is a feeder club for the Newport Gwent Dragons.

Club honours
2007/08 WRU Division Five East - Champions
2021/22 WRU Division Five East - Champions
2021/22 WRU Plate - Finalists

Notable past players
  Percy Coldrick (6 caps)
  Arthur Lewis
  David Nash
  Paul Turner
  Mike Watkins (4 caps)
  Billy Williams dual-code (4 caps union), (5 caps league)
  Andrew Gibbs

External links
 Crumlin RFC

References

Rugby clubs established in 1880
Welsh rugby union teams